The Rise of Igbinogun is a 2021 Nigerian action film written and directed by Innocent Ideh and co-produced by Tunde Aina and Innocent Chukwuma  Ideh. The movie stars  Shaffy Bello, Femi Branch, Blossom Chukwujekwu, Ego Nwosu, Akin Lewis, Damilare Kuku, Tina Mba, and Enyinna Nwigwe.

Synopsis 
The Rise of Igbinogun is a story of a young female warrior who wants to close the dichotomy that exists between the rich and the poor in the society. She steals from the rich in order to take care of the poor. She became wanted by the king's guards, the rich including his father but she became the messiah of the needy and poor people.

Premiere 
The movie was first premiered privately to the press, notable Nollywood personnel and movie critics at the Sky cinemas Sangotedo, Lagos State on 15 March 2022 in collaboration with Startimes. Three days later, the film was shown on cinemas across the country.

Cast 
Blossom Chukwujekwu, Shaffy Bello, Enyinna Nwigwe,  Tina MBA, Ego Nwosu, Akin Lewis,  Femi Branch, Damilare Kuku

References

External links 
 

2021 films
English-language Nigerian films
Nigerian action drama films
2021 action drama films